Lether Edward Frazar (December 1, 1904 – May 15, 1960) was a Louisiana politician who served as the 44th Lieutenant Governor of Louisiana. Frazar served in the Louisiana House of Representatives. His Ph.D. was from Columbia University. He was president of the University of Louisiana at Lafayette from 1938 to 1941 and of McNeese State University from 1944 to 1955.

References

Sources
"Lether Edward Frazar", A Dictionary of Louisiana Biography, Vol. I (1988), p. 319
Lether E. Frazar Collection
Earl's Whirl
University of Louisiana - presidents
2002 McNeese Football Banquet
University of Louisiana
Broussard Hall

McNeese State University Faculty/Staff Handbook
Listing of all Headstones located in Beauregard Parish
http://66.218.69.11/search/cache?p=lether+e.+frazar&toggle=1&ei=UTF-8&fr=yfp-t-501&u=www.burkfoster.com/StruckbyLightning.htm&w=lether+e+frazar&d=AaAyv0VuN1tv&icp=1&.intl=us
Douglass-Pruitt House

1904 births
1960 deaths
Politicians from Lake Charles, Louisiana
University of Louisiana at Lafayette alumni
Louisiana State University alumni
20th-century American educators
Lieutenant Governors of Louisiana
Democratic Party members of the Louisiana House of Representatives
Methodists from Louisiana
Columbia University alumni
American school principals
People from DeRidder, Louisiana
20th-century American politicians
Burials in Louisiana